The March West was the initial journey of the North-West Mounted Police (NWMP) to the Canadian prairies, made between July 8 and October 9, 1874.

It was the result of the force being deployed to what is now southern Alberta in response to the Cypress Hills Massacre and subsequent fears of a US military intervention. Their ill-planned and arduous journey of nearly  became known as the "March West" and was later portrayed by the force as an epic journey of endurance.

Background

Sir John A. Macdonald acquired approval for his new force on May 23, 1873, after Parliament, following a cursory debate, passed the Mounted Police Act into law unopposed. At this point, Macdonald appears to have intended to create a force of mounted police to watch "the frontier from Manitoba to the foot of the Rocky Mountains", probably with its headquarters in Winnipeg. He was heavily influenced by the model of the Royal Irish Constabulary, which combined aspects of a traditional military unit with the judicial functions of the magistrates' courts, and believed that the new force should be able to provide a local system of government in otherwise ungoverned areas. Macdonald had originally also wanted to form units of Métis policemen, commanded by white Canadian officers in a similar manner to the British Indian Army, but he was forced to abandon this approach after the Red River Rebellion of 1870 called their loyalty into question.

In June 1873, around 30 Assiniboines were killed in the Cypress Hills Massacre, creating a national furore. In response, Macdonald used a privy council Order-in-Council to implement the new legislation, formally creating the NWMP with the intention of mobilizing the force and deploying it early the next year. A report then arrived from Alexander Morris, the Lieutenant Governor of the North-West Territories, blaming the massacre on the activities of whisky traders at Fort Whoop-Up; Morris predicted that if action was not taken immediately, there would be a major uprising by the First Nations across the region, into which the United States might choose to intervene. Macdonald was not entirely convinced by the governor's analysis, but nonetheless he agreed to recruit 150 men and send them west to Lower Fort Garry before winter weather blocked the route.

Macdonald's Conservative government then fell from power over the Pacific Scandal and was replaced on November 7, 1873, by the Liberal administration of Alexander Mackenzie, who placed more credence on Morris's reports and had his own moral concerns about the whisky trade. These worries were amplified by calls from Washington for Ottawa to secure the frontier and so prevent American Indians from purchasing whisky in Canada. Mackenzie initially suggested sending a joint Canadian-United States military expedition, but, after Governor General Lord Dufferin and others noted the serious implications of inviting the US Army to deploy into Canadian territory, he instead agreed to deploy the new mounted police to carry out the operation. Another 150 men were recruited in eastern Canada and sent west by railway and river boat through the United States to rendezvous with the first part of the force at Fort Dufferin.

Deployment
The force was given orders to proceed to Fort Edmonton in order to resolve problems around Fort Whoop-Up, before then dispersing to various posts stretching westwards across the territories. From Fort Dufferin, one option was to trace the southern line of the frontier, following a well-established trail created two years before by the British and United States Boundary Commission. Morris disagreed with this approach, arguing that it might encourage an attack by the Sioux, and encouraged the NWMP to take a more northerly route. French finally agreed with Morris that the expedition would initially follow the trail, but would then steer away from the border and Sioux territory.

The march

The NWMP finally left Fort Dufferin on July 8, 1874. The 275 strong expedition was divided into six divisions, labelled A to F, supported by 310 horses, 143 draught oxen and 187 Red River carts and wagons, stretching out at least  along the track. The force took two field guns and two mortars for protection, cattle to use as food, and mowing machines for making hay. French had negotiated with the Canadian Illustrated News that the expedition be accompanied by Henri Julien, a journalist whom the Commissioner hoped would write a positive account of the new force.
The teams made only  a day at most, travelling under unpleasant and arduous conditions, made more difficult by the NWMP teamsters having little experience and the horses being unsuitable for draught work. On July 29, the badly depleted A Division, including those men suffering from dysentery, was left behind as the main force turned off the southerly trail and across the much drier and rougher plains to the north-west. Food began to run out and, due to the expedition having failed to bring any water bottles, the men had no option but to drink contaminated local water. Another detachment of the sicker men and livestock were left behind at Old Wives Lake. On August 24 the expedition reached the Cypress Hills, where the weather turned wet and cold, and the expedition's horses began to die. 

The NWMP had expected the area to contain good grazing for their horses but it was barren and treeless. French described it as "little better than a desert" and his men were reduced to drinking muddy water gathered from marshland. Having sent out search parties with no success, the expedition now faced the total loss of their horses and imminent starvation. 

After resupplying, French sent divisions D and E back east, before taking B, C and F to travel to Fort Whoop-Up. The expedition had been badly planned and executed, and almost failed; Baker describes it as "a monumental fiasco of poor planning, ignorance, incompetence, and cruelty to men and beasts".

Conclusion

When the police arrived at Fort Whoop-Up on October 9, they were prepared for a battle, but the whisky traders were aware that they were coming and had long since moved on. The NWMP had received new orders from Ottawa to garrison the area and settled down to build Fort Macleod on an island in Oldman River.

Legacy

Early historians of the force stressed the epic nature of the expedition. The popular historian Arthur Haydon, for example, scorned the newspaper accounts which blamed the officers and men as "incapable", "inexperienced" and "careless", arguing that the march was "truly one of the most extraordinary on record", of which "all Canadians might well feel proud. By 1955, however, the historian Paul Sharp had suggested that the March West almost failed due to "misinformation, inexperience and ignorance" and criticism of the force's performance intensified after 1973. Ronald Atkin concludes that the expedition was "epic in its lack of organisation, in the poor way in which it was conducted and its incredibly close brush with disaster", Daniel Francis condemns it as "a fiasco of bad planning", with R. C. Macleod observing that "the difficulties of the Long March...were largely self-inflicted". Nonetheless, it rapidly became portrayed by the force as epic story of bravery, endurance and determination.

References

Bibliography
 
 
 
 
 
 
 
 
North-West Mounted Police
History of Western Canada
British North America